Knightsburg is an unincorporated community in Muhlenberg County, Kentucky, United States.

Geography

Point of Interest 
The Rochester Dam is located almost a mile east of the community, along with the John Prine Memorial Park at Rochester Dam.

References

Unincorporated communities in Muhlenberg County, Kentucky
Unincorporated communities in Kentucky